Jennifer Susan Wylie (born March 6, 1958) is an American former competition swimmer.

Wylie represented the United States as a 14-year-old at the 1972 Summer Olympics in Munich, Germany.  She competed in the finals of the women's 400-meter freestyle and finished fifth overall in a time of 4:24.07.

References

1957 births
Living people
American female freestyle swimmers
Olympic swimmers of the United States
Sportspeople from Palo Alto, California
Swimmers at the 1972 Summer Olympics
21st-century American women